Nels Pierson (born December 29, 1972) is an American politician who served as a member of the Minnesota House of Representatives from 2015 to 2023. A member of the Republican Party of Minnesota, he represented the 26B district in southeastern Minnesota. The district includes a large part of the southern half of Rochester and greater Olmsted County to the south and east of the city. He was a candidate in the 2022 Minnesota's 1st congressional district special election.

Early life and education
Pierson was raised in Butterfield, Minnesota. He earned a Bachelor of Arts degree from Gustavus Adolphus College and a Juris Doctor from the Hamline University School of Law.

Career
Pierson was first elected to the Minnesota House of Representatives in 2014. He was a candidate in the 2022 Minnesota's 1st congressional district special election, losing to Brad Finstad in the May 24 primary.

Personal life
Pierson and his wife, Nicole, have five children.

References

External links

Rep. Nels Pierson official Minnesota House of Representatives website
Nels Pierson official campaign website

Category:Candidates in the 2022 United States House of Representatives elections

1972 births
21st-century American politicians
Gustavus Adolphus College alumni
Hamline University School of Law alumni
Living people
Republican Party members of the Minnesota House of Representatives